Karl Håkan Södergren (born 14 June 1959 in Rosersberg, Sweden) is a retired professional ice hockey player, often a recurring color commentator in Viasat's ice hockey broadcast productions.

Playing career
Södergren played for Djurgårdens IF Hockey in the Swedish elite league Elitserien during his entire professional career, winning the Swedish Championship four times. He finished his active playing career with Huddinge IK in the second tier in the Swedish league structure.

Internationally he played in 162 games with the Swedish national team, winning gold at the 1987 World Ice Hockey Championships and bronze at the 1984 and 1988 Winter Olympics. He was awarded the Stora Grabbars Märke (no. 125) and the Guldpucken (Elitserien Player of the Year) in 1987.

Off the ice
For the 1989 World Ice Hockey Championships Södergren recorded and sang solo in the Swedish national team's fight song "Nu tar vi dom" (Swedish for "let's get them"). He is residing in Oslo, Norway, with his two sons.

Awards
 Elitserien Silver Medal in 1979 and 1985.
 Swedish Champion with Djurgårdens IF Hockey in 1983, 1989, 1990 and 1991.
 Awarded the Guldpucken (Elitserien Player of the Year) in 1987.
 Bronze medal at the Winter Olympics in 1984 and 1988.
 Silver medal at the Ice Hockey World Championships in 1986.
 Gold medal at the Ice Hockey World Championships in 1987.

Records
 Elitserien record for penalty minutes in season 1983–84 (74)

Career statistics

Regular season and playoffs

International

External links
 

1959 births
Living people
Djurgårdens IF Hockey players
Huddinge IK players
Ice hockey players at the 1984 Winter Olympics
Ice hockey players at the 1988 Winter Olympics
Medalists at the 1984 Winter Olympics
Olympic bronze medalists for Sweden
Olympic ice hockey players of Sweden
Olympic medalists in ice hockey
People from Sigtuna Municipality
Swedish ice hockey left wingers
Medalists at the 1988 Winter Olympics
Sportspeople from Stockholm County